Jenkinjones is an unincorporated community and coal town in McDowell County, West Virginia, United States. It lies on the western flanks of Stone Ridge near the border with Tazewell County, Virginia.

History
It is the location of the Pocahontas Fuel Company Store and Office Buildings which were listed on the National Register of Historic Places in 1992. Its post office  was established on October 15, 1912. During the years of 1961–1975 it is documented that 8,290,780 tons of coal were mined by the Pocahontas Fuel Company at Jenkinjones.

Jenkinjones was named in 1912 for Jenkin B. Jones (1841–1916) who was born in Glynneath, Wales.

References

External links 
Description Of Jenkinjones as a Coal Town
The founder of Jenkinjones WV, Family History

Unincorporated communities in McDowell County, West Virginia
Unincorporated communities in West Virginia
Coal towns in West Virginia